The Bayshore Cutoff (originally the Southern Pacific Bay Shore Cut-Off) is the rail line between San Francisco and San Bruno along the eastern shore (San Francisco Bay side) of the San Francisco Peninsula. It was completed by Southern Pacific (SP) in 1907 at a cost of $7 million (equivalent to $ adjusted for inflation), and included five tunnels, four of which are still used by Caltrain, the successor to Southern Pacific's Peninsula Commute service. Fill from the five tunnels was used to build the Visitacion or Bayshore Yard, the main SP classification yard near the city of Brisbane. The Del Monte was similarly rerouted over the line at some point in its operational history.

The original alignment of the Coast Line completed in 1863 took it around the western side of San Bruno Mountain, through Colma and Daly City.

Once the Bayshore Cutoff was completed, and main line traffic was shifted to it, the former route was renamed the Ocean View line and became a branch. It was used to carry coffins to Colma; it was severed in the 1940s, but a few miles at the south end was still in SP's 1996 timetable. In the late 1980s BART purchased the right-of-way of the Ocean View line for the San Francisco International Airport extension south from Daly City.

Bayshore Cutoff Tunnel 5, at Sierra Point, was abandoned when the easternmost tip of the point was leveled during construction of the Bayshore Freeway in 1955–56, and the line was rerouted through the leveled section as well. The rail yard was in operation until the 1970s, and the site is currently being considered for redevelopment for light industrial/retail use as part of the Brisbane Baylands development project.

History

The original route between San Francisco and San Bruno was laid by the San Francisco and San Jose Railroad (SF&SJ), one of the companies that later was absorbed into the Southern Pacific (SP). From the station in San Francisco at Mariposa and 18th, tracks were laid generally bearing west-southwest through the Mission District close to the present-day route of San Jose Avenue.

Southern Pacific took over the Peninsula Corridor in 1870 from the SF&SJ and began operating the Peninsula Commute between San Francisco and San Jose. Surveys were conducted for an alternate route east of San Bruno Mountain as early as 1878 and in 1894, it was revealed that SP had secretly purchased a more direct route along the shoreline of San Francisco Bay through an agent, Alfred E. Davis, who had previously built a narrow-gauge railroad to Santa Cruz. By 1900, the Bayshore Cutoff route, including five tunnels, had been designed and plans were announced to start work "within a few weeks". The San Francisco Board of Supervisors attempted to compel SP to start using the Bayshore route by passing an ordinance in 1900 directing the Board of Public Works (BPW) to tear up the existing tracks. SP was granted an injunction to prevent that action, but BPW Commissioner Maguire planned to bring witnesses "to testify that the clanging of bells, shrieks of whistles, etc., interferes with the comfort and peace of the surrounding residents."

SP announced firm plans to build the Bayshore Cutoff and double-track the line in late 1901. President E. H. Harriman reiterated SP's plans to construct the Cutoff in mid-1902, predicting completion within the calendar year. In conjunction with the Dumbarton Cutoff, the Bayshore Cutoff was designed to facilitate transcontinental rail service into San Francisco. Instead of being a remote spur terminal, San Francisco would become "practically the same as a main line station" with the completion of the two new cutoffs, and transcontinental freight could then be loaded directly on trains without having to be ferried across the Bay.

The San Jose-based Evening News touted the benefits of the Cutoff, saying the fifteen minute savings in travel time combined with a more temperate climate would naturally lead to increased population in San Jose: "The warmer, drier and more even climatic conditions make [San Jose] far preferable for residence to a place where the men feel the need of an overcoat in the evening of the warmest days, and where the ladies scarcely know what it is to dress in light clothing and walk out in the evening." In 1903, the route of the Bayshore Cutoff was adjusted slightly; the original route called for tracks along Islais and Tulare streets, which due to their narrow width, would have closed those streets to any other traffic. Over a one-year period, Joseph B. Coryell acted as agent for SP to purchase properties bordering Islais Creek to allow the rerouting of the line.

The Bayshore Railway company was founded as a subsidiary of the Southern Pacific to build the Bayshore Cutoff. Construction started in 1904 and was completed in 1907 at a cost of $7 million (equivalent to $ in ), one of the most expensive rail lines constructed to date. In comparison, the Lucin Cutoff, which included a trestle across the northern end of the Great Salt Lake and saved  of distance, cost $9 million. The Bayshore Cutoff, along with the Lucin and Montalvo Cutoffs, alleviated three key bottlenecks for Southern Pacific.

Rail traffic to San Francisco shifted over to the new Bayshore Cutoff immediately and has remained on that route ever since. Caltrain now runs daily commuter trains through four of the tunnels built for the Bayshore Cutoff. The fifth tunnel at Sierra Point was bypassed with the completion of the Bayshore Freeway about 1956.

The prior route west of San Bruno Mountain was renamed the Ocean View line and relegated to branch status. Although the Ocean View line was severed in 1942, the rails remained in place until the right-of-way was sold to the Bay Area Rapid Transit District and construction began on the SFO BART extension. Other potential routes proposed for the BART extension included an aerial structure along El Camino Real and a rail line parallel to I-280/380.

SP also completed a rail yard at Visitacion near the city of Brisbane. SP had previously purchased Visitacion Cove and partially filled it using earth excavated from the tunnels as well as mud dredged from the Bay. The yard was used to assemble trains and a large roundhouse and shops were used for steam locomotive maintenance. After diesel locomotives replaced steam by 1958 (the last steam locomotive in SP's system was a Peninsula Commute engine, which ran on January 22, 1957), the yard was used less frequently. SP consolidated freight operations at Oakland in 1964, and the Bayshore Yard began to be dismantled in 1979. The last day of work at the Bayshore shops was October 25, 1982; the land was sold to Universal Paragon in 1989.

Design
The line included five tunnels, numbered north to south, and a former railyard near Brisbane, the Visitacion or Bayshore Yard. The historic Bayshore Roundhouse, previously used to service SP's steam locomotives, still exists at the yard. The first four tunnels are within the city limits of San Francisco.

The maximum grade of the completed Bayshore Cutoff is  (0.3% grade) compared to the 3% maximum grade of the older route.

After completion, travel time from San Jose to San Francisco was cut from two hours to ninety minutes (for local trains) and seventy minutes (for limited-stop trains). The Evening News breathlessly advertised "the annihilation of seventeen minutes in a schedule" in an article covering the opening of the Cutoff.

Although the Bayshore Cutoff is double-tracked, the right-of-way outside the tunnels is sized to accommodate quad tracks. Quad tracks were added in Brisbane as part of the Caltrain Express project from 2004 to 2006.

Construction
Initial bids on construction costs ranged between $2 and $2.5 million (between $ and $ in  adjusted for inflation). Preliminary work began in April 1904, and actual construction started on October 26 of that year. An earthquake in late November 1904 was at first mistaken for blasting being done for the Cutoff. Work on the first tunnel (which was later designated Tunnel No. 5) at Sierra Point began on April 18, 1905, and at the time it was predicted that revenue service would begin on December 31, 1906. After the Lucin Cutoff was completed, workers on that job moved to the Bayshore project, and orders were placed for forty iron arches, each spanning , to be used in tunnel construction.

By May 1905, good progress was being made, as workers excavating the tunnel had found "nothing harder than sand and earth", but they were forced to wear rubber clothes due to the damp conditions. Two shifts of work were started in June, and the stone blocks to be used in the portals had arrived at Tunnel 5. By July, work on the final tunnel (later designated Tunnel No. 3) had started, and SP General Manager E.E. Calvin confidently predicted all tunnels would be completed in 1906. Heavy rain during February 1906 damaged the roadbed between South San Francisco and San Bruno when the final stages of construction were about to commence.

Work was being performed in two shifts when the 1906 San Francisco earthquake struck in April. Workers in Tunnel 3 (below the orphanage) were terrified by the shaking, which extinguished the lamps they were using, but no one was injured and the tunnel was not damaged. After the earthquake, construction continued. Earthquake survivors were unnerved by blasting for the tunnels, which they thought were aftershocks. Some of the areas for the Bayshore Cutoff route south of China Basin were filled with rubble from the earthquake, allowing more rapid progress than planned. SP officials announced in August 1906 the estimated completion date for the Bayshore Cutoff would be January 24, 1907. Once the Cutoff was in place, they stated that more frequent service would be offered for commuters, with headways of 30 minutes and total travel time to San Jose estimated at one hour.

By July 1907, four bridges still needed to be completed for the Cutoff, touted to be "one of the fastest pieces of railroad in the United States" once it was completed. The steel girders were delayed in transit and the completion date of the Cutoff was delayed from October to November 1907. A final carload of steel was rushed from Ogden to complete the Fifth Avenue crossing, and the first planned passenger trains to use the Cutoff would be for fans from San Francisco traveling to Stanford to watch a football game. The new line officially opened on December 8, 1907.

Tunnels

After these first two drifts were completed, the concrete side walls were partially built and timber supports were placed to allow the excavation of two more drifts on top of the first drifts up to the springing line where the semicircular brick arch meets the concrete side walls. With the side drift excavation complete, the concrete side walls are poured. A fifth drift was then bored at the apex of the tunnel, followed by excavation of the remaining space between the apex and side drifts. Once these initial excavations were complete, leaving a "core" of rock in the center of the tunnel, timber bracing was placed to support the rock at the top of the tunnel and a steel arch form was installed. After covering the arch form with planks, five to six layers of brick were laid to form the semicircular arch, resting on concrete side walls. The space between the top of the arch and the excavated tunnel was backfilled with loose rock, or concrete if the pressure was especially large. The temporary timber supports and arch form were removed, and the remainder of the tunnel was cleared by blasting, with the blasted rock being sorted for incorporation in the concrete.

Tunnels 1 and 2 bracket the present-day  station. Tunnel 1 is just north of the station, and Tunnel 2 is south. Both tunnels are cut through Potrero Hill. Tunnel 2 is the only one of the five tunnels built with twin bores to accommodate four tracks, although the western bore is currently closed. The western bore was built because a high concrete retaining wall was needed to support a city street running alongside that second tunnel. Tunnel Top Park, at 1100 Pennsylvania Avenue, is within the Caltrain-owned right-of-way. These two tunnels were bored through mostly serpentinite rock with clay seams.

The Western Pacific Railroad (WP) also built a tunnel through Potrero Hill at nearly the same time; support timbers within the Western Pacific tunnel caught fire in 1962, leading to its collapse and subsequent fill. The area on top of the WP tunnel remained undeveloped until the 1990s.

Tunnel 3 traverses the Hunters Point neighborhood. It was built under the St. Joseph's orphan asylum. Tunnel 3 is bored through wet sand and hard silicated formations.

Tunnel 4 crosses Candlestick Point. The former Schlage factory and headquarters, constructed in 1926, are located just west of the southern portal of Tunnel 4. In 1907, it was noted that Tunnel 4 had been bored through very wet ground and partly through shale. The earthquake of April 1906 caused a spring to start leaking into Tunnel 4, which went unnoticed until several months after the seismic event, when the reinforced concrete of the completed tunnel began to bulge, eventually causing water to leak into the tunnel. The spring was not capped until 1911.

Tunnel 5 crosses Sierra Point and was bored through hard sandstone. Tunnel 5 was abandoned in 1956 when the old Bayshore Highway (which is now the present-day Bayshore Boulevard in Brisbane and South San Francisco) was expanded into the six-lane divided Bayshore Freeway. The route for the freeway was moved to the east along a new causeway constructed on fill between Candlestick Point and Sierra Point, which also pushed the rail line east, eliminating the need for the tunnel. Some of the fill was taken by razing Sierra Point to the level of the railroad. The southern portal would have emerged between Bayshore Boulevard and the Bayshore Freeway, but it has since been filled in. The northern portal still exists, but access is restricted by a padlocked fence next to a parking lot just off Bayshore Boulevard.

Bayshore Yard

Fill taken from tunnel excavation and cuts was used to build a new railyard at Visitacion. SP purchased Visitacon Cove and constructed  of trestles to dump fill into San Francisco Bay, reclaiming  of land in total.

An additional  of track were authorized in January 1917 along with the main shop buildings. By 1921, the Bayshore Yard was substantially complete.

The design of the Bayshore Yard had thirty-eight tracks in the main freight space; seven tracks on both the north and south ends each had a capacity of fifty cars. The north end of the yard also had fourteen storage tracks (total capacity of 472 cars) and eighteen classification tracks. In all, the total capacity of the railyard was 1,068 cars on 24 inbound tracks, and 1,078 cars on 19 outbound tracks. 7 of the outbound tracks had a maximum capacity of 74 cars each. SP consolidated its freight and maintenance operations at the Bayshore Yard; maintenance had previously been performed at two locations: 16th and Harrison, and Mariposa. The yard hump was the second hump constructed on the West Coast (after the classification yard at Roseville).

Steam locomotive maintenance would start in the Roundhouse. At the height of operations between 1911 and 1958, more than 3,000 were employed at the railyard and shops. As SP's most heavily traveled segment, the railyard handled 22 million gross tons per mile of freight in the 1920s and 46.5 million gross tons per mile during World War II.

The Bayshore Yard site was acquired by Tuntex (now Universal Paragon) in 1989. Universal Paragon has proposed redeveloping the area as the Brisbane Baylands development. , the only buildings left from the railyard are the Roundhouse (built c.1910, abandoned), the Tank and Boiler Shop (built c.1920, leased to Lazzari Fuel in 1963 and used as a charcoal warehouse), and the Visitacion Ice Manufacturing Plant (built 1924 for Pacific Fruit Express, currently leased to Machinery and Equipment, Inc.).

Bayshore Roundhouse

The Southern Pacific Railroad Bayshore Roundhouse, at the junction of Industrial Way and Bayshore Ave. in Brisbane, California, was listed on the National Register of Historic Places in 2010.

The Bayshore Roundhouse was completed in 1910 and still stands, although it was damaged in an October 2001 fire which destroyed approximately half the roof. Construction on the Roundhouse started in 1908, shortly after the Bayshore Cutoff was completed, and it was one of the first buildings at the new Bayshore railyard.

Seventeen of the stalls (numbered #24 to #40, clockwise) were inside the building and covered. Stalls #1 to #23 were outside whisker tracks, although construction plans, contemporary articles, and the presence of foundation pilings suggest the roundhouse was originally designed to enclose these as well. The wall adjacent to stall #40, on the eastern side of the building, contains four sets of windows, and the outer circumference of the building has two sets of windows for each stall. There is one fire wall (between stalls #32 and #33) without windows (which stopped the 2001 fire from destroying the roof of stalls 33–40), and the wall adjacent to stall #24 does not have windows, since it was originally intended to serve as a second interior fire wall.

The fire in 2001 destroyed the roof covering stalls #24 through #32. Today, it is the last standing brick roundhouse in California, and it was added to the National Register of Historic Places in 2010.

Other structures
One scene for the film Harold and Maude was filmed at the Bayshore Yard; the Backshops building was used as the studio of Glaucus, the artist who is carving a nude of Maude in ice. That building was demolished in the mid-1980s.

The Tank and Boiler Shops ceased operation with the end of steam locomotives in the 1950s, and was leased to the Lazzari Fuel Company in 1963, who use it today to store charcoal.

The Visitacion Ice Manufacturing Plant, at the southern end of the Bayshore Yard, was completed in 1924. It was capable of freezing  of ice per day, and could store . It made ice between 1924 and 1955 for Pacific Fruit Express refrigerated cars. The building was sold to the Market Street Van & Storage Company in 1962.

Stations
From north to south:
 San Francisco Third and Townsend (Closed 1975)
 San Francisco 4th and King
  (between Tunnel 1 and Tunnel 2)
  (Closed 2005; between Tunnel 3 and Tunnel 4)
  (between Tunnel 4 and Tunnel 5)
 Butler Road (Closed 1983)

References

External links

Railyard and roundhouse
 
 
 

1907 establishments in California
National Register of Historic Places in San Mateo County, California
Railroad cutoffs
Southern Pacific Railroad
Transport infrastructure completed in 1907
Transportation in San Francisco
Transportation in San Mateo County, California
Underground commuter rail